Satan on Earth is the 1919 US title of a 2-reel  silent short subject produced in France by the Gaumont Film Company.

References

French silent short films
1919 films
French black-and-white films
1910s French films